Leon Maximilian Flach (born February 28, 2001) is an American professional soccer player who plays as a midfielder and left-back for the Philadelphia Union of Major League Soccer.

Club career

FC St. Pauli
Flach made his professional debut for FC St. Pauli in the 2. Bundesliga on September 27, 2020, coming on as a substitute in the 85th minute for Jannes Wieckhoff against 1. FC Heidenheim, which finished as a 4–2 home win.

Flach scored his first professional goal for FC St. Pauli on 3 January 2021, scoring in the 82nd minute against Greuther Fürth in a 2–1 loss.

Philadelphia Union
In March 2021, Flach signed a two-year contract with Philadelphia Union competing in Major League Soccer. Flach's debut with the Union was starting in the club's first CONCACAF Champions League match, defeating Deportivo Saprissa 1–0. Flach scored his first goal for the Union on October 3 against reigning MLS Champions, Columbus Crew in a 3–0 win. His performances throughout the 2021 season made Flach a regular starter in the Union midfield and was recognized as being named among the MLS's 22 under 22.

Career Statistics

Club

Personal life 
Flach was born in Texas to German parents while his father was working in Houston before returning to Hamburg as a child. He has represented Germany and the United States at youth level. Flach is a fan of the Houston Texans.

References

External links
 
 
 
 

2001 births
Living people
People from Humble, Texas
American people of German descent
Sportspeople from Harris County, Texas
Soccer players from Texas
American soccer players
German footballers
Association football midfielders
United States men's youth international soccer players
Germany youth international footballers
United States men's under-20 international soccer players
2. Bundesliga players
Major League Soccer players
FC St. Pauli players
Philadelphia Union players